Boaz M. Levin (born 1989, Jerusalem) is a Berlin-based writer, curator and filmmaker. In 2022, Levin was co-curator of the 3rd Chennai Photo Biennale. In 2017, he was co-curator together with Florian Ebner, Kerstin Meinicke, Kathrin Schonegg, and Christin Müller of the 7th edition of the Biennale für aktuelle Fotografie, which takes place in Mannheim, Ludwigshafen and Heidelberg.  He is the editor of Cabinet Magazine's Kiosk. His essay, "On Distance", was published by Atlas Projectos, Berlin (ed. Laura Preston), as part of the Next Spring series of occasional reviews.His writing has been published by magazines such as Camera Austria, Texte Zur Künst, and Frieze. He is an AICA, and ICOM member. Levin has curated exhibitions at the Martin-Gropius-Bau, Heidelberger Kunstverein, The Jewish Museum Munich, and Kunstraum Kreuzberg/Bethanien, and the Museum für Kunst und Gewerbe, Hamburg, among other venues. Levin is the co-founder, together with Vera Tollmann and Hito Steyerl, of the Research Center for Proxy Politics.

Life and Education
Levin is the son of poet and translator Gabriel Levin and Anat Flug-Levin, a psychoanalyst. He is the grandson of Noach Flug. He studied in at Bezalel Academy of Arts and Design, and then at Berlin University of the Arts where he graduated as Meisterschüler from the class of Hito Steyerl in 2014. Since October 2016, Levin is a  PhD candidate and member of the "Cultures of Critique" research training group at the Leuphana University, Lüneburg.

Work
Levin's work deals with the relationship between politics, aesthetics, technology and ecology. His work has been exhibited at the CCA (Tel-Aviv), Former West, HKW (Berlin), Recontres Internationales (Paris, Berlin), FIDMarseille (Marseille), European Media Arts Festival (Osnäbruck), Human Resources (Los Angeles) The School of Kyiv (Kyiv biennial), La Gaîté Lyrique (Paris), Auto Italia South East (London), Years (Copenhagen) and Dinca Vision quest (Chicago).

Regarding Spectatorship: revolt and the distant observer, a curatorial research project co-curated together with Marianna Liosi, was shown at Kunstraum Kreuzberg/Bethanien November 2015.

All That Is Solid Melts Into Data (2015, 54 min), co-directed with Ryan S. Jeffery, premiered in FIDMarseille. All That is Solid Melts into Data "traces the architectural development of data centers, those curiously mammoth, often inaccessible glass-and-concrete “anti-monuments” that facilitate the ever-quickening communication we modern-day citizens take for granted. The film builds two simultaneous and equally compelling pictures of the USA — through its physical landscapes (frequently windowless, in-plain-sight complexes relocated to increasingly remote locales), and through the more troubling sociopolitical undercurrents that actively shape its digital economy". The film has been described as a "clinical dissection of the material effects of data (and by inference, the internet) on the future conditions of the city." The production of the film was supported by the Ostrovsky Family Fund.

Levin was the curator of "Say Shibboleth! On Visible and Invisible Borders", an exhibition by the Jewish Museums in Hohenems (Austria), and Munich (Germany).

In 2020, Levin was the curator of "BPA at Gropius Studios", a series of artist presentations in collaboration between the Martin-Gropius-Bau, and Berlin Program for Artists, which facilitates exchange between emerging and experienced Berlin-based artists, through coordinated studio visits and meetings. Levin has given workshops and seminars in numerous art-schools and universities, including Goldsmiths, University of London, HFBK, Hamburg, UDK, Berlin, and Shenkar College, Ramat Gan.

Research Center for Proxy Politics 
Between September 2014 and August 2017, the Research Center for Proxy Politics (RCPP), hosted over twenty talks and workshops for students and the public on the evolving concept of “proxy politics". Founded by Vera Tollman, Hito Steyerl and Boaz Levin, RCPP "reflects upon the nature of medial networks and their actors, that is, machines and things as well as humans." According to RCPP, "proxies are now emblematic of a post-representational political age, one increasingly populated by bot militias, puppet states, ghostwriters, and communication relays". Levin and Tollmann have argued that "proxies are fundamentally ambivalent, and our current politics engages proxies at all levels".

Awards
Last Person Shooter (2014), co-directed together with Adam Kaplan, was awarded the Ostrovsky Family Foundation Award for Experimental Cinema and Video Art in the 32nd Jerusalem Film Festival, 2015.

Books 
RCPP (Boaz Levin and Vera Tollmann) ed. The Proxy and its Politics (Berlin: Archive Books, 2017)  
Co-editor, Extractor, Board Game and Catalog accompanying Simon Denny's exhibition, MINE, MONA, Australia.  
Boaz Levin and Vera Tollmann (RCPP), “A single swing of the shovel”, Former West: Art and the Contemporary After 1989, ed. Maria Hlavajova, Simon Sheikh, MIT Press 2017. 
Boaz Levin, "Resisting Images", Farewell Photography. Ed. Christin Müller and Florian Ebner. Verlag Walther König, 2017. , 
On Distance, ed. Laura Preston, Berlin: Atlas Projectos, 2020. 
Wendy Hui Kyong Chun, Boaz Levin and Vera Tollmann, "Proxies" in: Uncertain Archives: Critical Keywords for Big Data, ed. Nanna Bonder Thulstrup, Daniela Agostinho, Annie Ring, Catherine D'Ignacio and Kristin Veel, The MIT Press, 2021

Writing
  https://www.skulptur-projekte.de/#/En/Publications/Publications/380/Out-of-Body "The Body of the Web", Boaz Levin and Vera Tollmann (RCPP) for Skulptur Projekte Münster 2017 in frieze d/e (2016).
 Boaz Levin and Vera Tollmann, "Plunge Into Proxy Politics", Springerin (2015)
 Boaz Levin and Ryan S. Jeffery, Lost in The Cloud, for Spheres Journal, Leuphana University, Lüneburg.
Boaz Levin, ALLES, essay in artist book by Tobias Zielony, Étude books, Paris.
Boaz Levin, Nothing Consoles You Like Despair, an essay on the work of Richard Frater, Contemporary Hum
On the Shores of Inequality / Boaz Levin on “Ground Zero” at Schinkel Pavillon, Berlin, Texte Zur Kunst Issue No. 117.

References

External links
 [http://www.haaretz.com/israel-news/.premium-1.534549 | YouTube, MeTube: Israeli Artist Reveals the Inner Workings of the Internet Video Database, Haaretz
 [https://www.hkw.de/de/app/mediathek/video/62068] | Benjamin Bratton, Vera Tollmann & Boaz Levin, Anna Echterhölter: Processing Sovereignty, panel as part of 1948 Unbound, HKW Berlin.

Israeli artists
1989 births
Living people
Israeli curators